Victoria Filanovsky (born February 23, 1995 in Saint Petersburg, Russia) is a retired Israeli individual rhythmic gymnast.

Personal life
Filanovsky speaks Hebrew, Russian and English.

Career 
Veinberg Filanovsky became a member of the Israeli Gymnastics National Team in 2008. She competed at the 2010 European Junior Championships in Bremen where she qualified to two event finals, finishing 6th in rope and 5th in clubs, as well as qualifying in the 2010 Youth Olympic Games where she finished 6th in the all-around.

Veinberg Filanovsky's first senior international competition was in the 2011 season, competing in her first Worlds at the 2011 World Championships in Montpellier, France and placing 39th in qualifications. In 2012, she became the Israeli National Champion ahead of Neta Rivkin. She qualified for her first event final in the World Cup Series in Penza, Russia finishing 8th in ball. She competed at the 2012 London Olympics Test Event and placed 15th; she did not qualify for the 2012 Olympics.

In 2013, she competed in the World Cup and Grand Prix Series. At the 2013 Holon Grand Prix, Veinberg Filanovsky won her first Grand Prix medal, winning the bronze in all-around ahead of Russian Alexandra Merkulova. She competed at the 2013 European Championships with the Israeli team, finishing 5th in the team event. In the 2013 World Championships, she finished 21st in the all-around final behind Salome Phajava. She then competed at the 2013 World Games, finishing 8th in ball, 6th in hoop and 7th in the clubs final.

In 2014, Veinberg Filanovsky finished 7th in all-around at the 2014 Corbeil-Essonnes World Cup, and qualified to all four event finals for the first time in her World Cup competitions. On May 30–June 1, she competed at the 2014 Minsk World Cup. On June 10–15, she competed at the 2014 European Championships and finished 12th in the all-around final. On September 5–7, at the 2014 World World Cup Final in Kazan, Russia, Veinberg Filanovsky finished 9th in all-around behind Neta Rivkin, and qualified to one event final, finishing 7th in clubs. On September 22–28, Veinberg Filanovsky (along with teammates Neta Rivkin and Martina Poplinsky) represented Israel at the 2014 World Championships where Team Israel finished in 4th place. She finished 12th in the all-around finals behind Kseniya Moustafaeva of France. On October 18–20, Veinberg Filanovsky competed at the 2014 Grand Prix Berlin and won the all-around silver behind Russia's Maria Titova, while in event finals she won silver medals in hoop, clubs and ribbon. On November 1–3, Veinberg Filanovsky won the all-around bronze at the 2014 Grand Prix Brno behind compatriot Neta Rivkin. On November 14–16, at the 2014 Grand Prix Final in Innsbruck, Austria, Veinberg Filanovsky finished 4th in the all-around behind Bulgaria's Neviana Vladinova. In event finals, she won silver in ball and two bronze (clubs, ribbon).

In 2015, Veinberg Filanovsky withdrew from her first event of the season at the  Moscow Grand Prix because of injury. On March 21–22 she returned to competition at the 2015 Thiais Grand Prix, finishing 5th in the all-around and qualified to four event finals. On March 27–29, she competed at the 2015 Lisboa World Cup finishing 9th in the all-around and qualified to two event finals. She then competed at the 2015 Bucharest World Cup and finished 7th in the all-around. On April 10–12, she finished 10th in the all-around at the 2015 Pesaro World Cup. Veinberg Filanovsky and teammate Neta Rivkin competed at the 2015 European Championships where Team Israel finished 4th; she qualified to two event finals, finishing 5th in hoop and 8th in ball. Veinberg Filanovsky competed at the 2015 Holon Grand Prix finishing 7th in all-around, she qualified to 3 event finals. On May 22–24, Veinberg Filanovsky competed at the 2015 Tashkent World Cup finishing 4th in the all-around with a total of 70.450 points behind Korean Son Yeon-Jae; she qualified to all four apparatus finals. At the 2015 Grand Prix Berlin, Veinberg Filanovsky finished 5th in all-around (71.150) behind teammate Neta Rivkin; she again qualified to four apparatus finals. On June 15–21, Veinberg Filanovsky competed at the inaugural 2015 European Games where she finished 10th in the all-around. In August, Veinberg Filanovsky won the all-around gold at the 2015 Baltic Cup beating Azeri gymnast Marina Durunda. At the 2015 Budapest World Cup, Veinberg Filanovsky finished 8th in the all-around behind Durunda. She qualified to three apparatus finals, finishing 7th (clubs, ball) and 8th (ribbon). At the 2015 Sofia World Cup, Veinberg Filanovsky finished 13th in the all-around and qualified to the ribbon finals. At the 2015 World Cup Final in Kazan, Veinberg Filanovsky finished 16th in the all-around and qualified to the apparatus final in ribbon. On September 9–13, Veinberg Filanovsky (together with teammates Neta Rivkin and Linoy Ashram) competed at the 2015 World Championships in Stuttgart, with Team Israel finishing 4th. Veinberg Filanovsky qualified to the all-around finals, finishing in 21st place.

In 2016, Veinberg-Filanovsky competed at the 2016 Espoo World Cup finishing 13th in the all-around and qualified to the hoop final. On March 17–20, she competed at the 2016 Lisboa World Cup where she finished 12th in the all-around and qualified to three apparatus finals. At the 2016 Baltic Hoop, she won the all-around silver behind Russian Karina Kuznetsova. On April 1–3, she competed at the 2016 Pesaro World Cup where she finished 14th in the all-around. On May 6–8, Veinberg-Filanovsky competed at the Brno Grand Prix finishing 4th in the all-around with a total of 72.100 points; she qualified to all four apparatus finals and won a bronze in ball and ribbon. On May 13–15, Veinberg-Filanovsky finished 6th in the all-around at the 2016 Grand Prix Bucharest. She finished 6th in the all-around at the 2016 Minsk World Cup and qualified to three apparatus finals. On June 17–19, Veinberg-Filanovsky competed at the 2016 European Championships where she finished in 6th place, scoring a new personal best of 73.082 points. On July 1–3, she competed at the 2016 Berlin World Cup finishing 6th in the all-around with a total of 71.700 points; she qualified to all four apparatus finals. She withdrew from competition at the 2016 Kazan World Cup because of injury. On September 23–24, Veinberg-Filanovsky culminated her season with the 2016 Grand Prix Final in Eilat, where she finished 5th in the all-around with a total of 72.383 points behind teammate Linoy Ashram. She qualified to all the apparatus finals, winning a silver in clubs and bronze in hoop, ball and ribbon.

In the 2017 season, Veinberg-Filanovsky competed at the 2017 Grand Prix Moscow, finishing 10th in the all-around and qualified to the clubs and ribbon finals. She then competed at the 2017 Baltic Hoop, winning the all-around gold medal. On March 17–19, Veinberg-Filanovsky won the all-around bronze medal at the Grand Prix Kiev behind Yulia Bravikova. On March 31 – April 2, Filanovsky competed at the 2017 Grand Prix Marbella finishing 7th in the all-around and qualified to all the apparatus finals. On April 7–9, Veinberg-Filanovsky competed at the 2017 Pesaro World Cup, finishing 7th in the all-around and qualified to the final in ball. She then competed at the 2017 Tashkent World Cup, finishing 9th in the all-around and qualified to the hoop and ribbon finals. Her next competition was the 2017 Baku World Cup where she finished 5th in the all-around behind Alina Harnasko; she qualified to the apparatus finals and won her first gold medal in the World Cup – a gold in clubs. On May 12–14, Veinberg-Filanovsky competed at the 2017 World Challenge Cup in Portimao where she won her first all-around medal, a bronze behind Russia's Elizaveta Lugovskikh. Here she qualified to four event finals where she won a career best of three gold medals in hoop, ball and ribbon and finished 4th in clubs. On May 19–21, Filanovsky and teammate Linoy Ashram represented Israel at the 2017 European Championships in Budapest, Hungary. Her next event was at the 2017 World Challenge Cup Guadalajara where she finished 9th in the all-around, and qualified to two apparatus finals. Veinberg-Filanovsky's last competition was at the Holon Grand Prix where she finished 4th in the all-around. She announced her retirement a few days after that event.

Routine music information

References

External links
 
 

1995 births
Living people
Israeli rhythmic gymnasts
Jewish gymnasts
Gymnasts at the 2010 Summer Youth Olympics
European Games competitors for Israel
Gymnasts at the 2015 European Games
Israeli people of Russian-Jewish descent
Russian emigrants to Israel
Russian Jews